We The People is a television talk show in India hosted by Sarah Jacob. The programme is broadcast every Sunday night at 8 pm on NDTV 24x7. It was originally hosted by Barkha Dutt.

Show format 
We the People is a debate show on current affairs. A six- to eight-person panel is invited for each discussion. A panel typically consists of politicians, social scientists, academicians, social workers and celebrities, depending on the topic. The live audience often poses questions directly to panelists and are occasionally asked for a snap poll to weigh in on an argument. The show encompasses a wide variety of topics and is not limited to political issues.

Awards and accolades 
We The People won the 14th Asian Television Award for Best Talk Show for the year 2008 and Best Talk Show (English) at the "NT Award 2000". Barkha was named "the most intelligent TV host" by Indian Television Awards, and also as Best Talk Show Anchor.

List of episodes

2001

2005

2006

2007

2008

2009

2010

2011

2012

2013

2020

References

External links 
Barkha Dutt's website
 
 We the People at Facebook

Indian television talk shows
NDTV Group